The Kneeling Man is a work originally conceived in 1888 by the French artist Auguste Rodin for his The Gates of Hell project.

Reuse
The work's arms and torso were reused for The Birth of Venus, a female version - Gates features both the male and female versions in the tympanum and the upper part of the right-hand panel. The same male figure was also used as part of The Maiden Kissed by the Ghost.

Versions
It was cast in bronze with a brown and green patina in 1960 by the Rudier Foundry. One of these bronze casts is now in the Museo Soumaya in Mexico City.

See also
List of sculptures by Auguste Rodin

References

External links

Sculptures by Auguste Rodin
1888 sculptures
Sculptures of the Museo Soumaya
Bronze sculptures in Mexico